The 1977 Tennessee Volunteers football team (variously "Tennessee", "UT" or the "Vols") represented the University of Tennessee in the 1977 NCAA Division I football season. Playing as a member of the Southeastern Conference (SEC), the team was led by head coach Johnny Majors, in his first year, and played their home games at Neyland Stadium in Knoxville, Tennessee. They finished the season with a record of four wins and seven losses (4–7 overall, 1–5 in the SEC).

Schedule

Personnel

Team players drafted into the NFL

Reference:

References

Tennessee
Tennessee Volunteers football seasons
Tennessee Volunteers football